Bill Whitaker (born August 26, 1951) is an American television journalist and a correspondent on the CBS News program 60 Minutes.

Early life and education
Whitaker graduated from Hobart College with a Bachelor's degree in American history. He went on to graduate study at Boston University, earning a Master's degree in African-American studies. He also attended a graduate journalism program at the University of California, Berkeley in 1978.

Career
Whitaker's broadcast journalism career began in 1979 at KQED in San Francisco, California. In 1982, Whitaker became a correspondent for WBTV in Charlotte, North Carolina. He moved to Atlanta, Georgia, and covered politics from 1985 to 1989. He joined CBS News as a reporter in November 1984. He became the CBS News Tokyo correspondent from 1989 to 1992. In November 1992, Whitaker moved to Los Angeles and became a CBS News correspondent there.

During his time at CBS, Whitaker has covered many large events or disasters. Some include the Fukushima Daiichi nuclear disaster, the 2010 Haiti earthquake, and the War in Afghanistan (more specifically in Kabul). He also has covered many race-related issues such as policing in cities such as Cleveland, Chicago, and Tulsa. In Tulsa, Whitaker had a notable first interview with Betty Jo Shelby, the former police officer accused of shooting and killing Terence Crutcher, an unarmed black man.

In March 2014, Whitaker was made a correspondent for the CBS news program 60 Minutes, for which he began reporting in the fall season.

In 2021, following the death of host Alex Trebek, it was announced that Whitaker, among others, would guest-host Jeopardy!  His ten episodes aired May 3–14, 2021.

Awards and recognition
Whitaker was awarded an honorary Doctorate of Humane Letters from Hobart and William Smith Colleges in 1997.

In June 2015, Whitaker received an honorary doctorate from Knox College in Illinois.

Personal life 
For many years, Whitaker lived in Los Angeles but after receiving the assignment with 60 Minutes, he moved to New York City.

See also
 Investigative journalism
 New Yorkers in journalism

References

External links

African-American journalists
Television personalities from Philadelphia
People from Los Angeles
Hobart and William Smith Colleges alumni
Boston University College of Arts and Sciences alumni
Living people
Whitaker, Bill
Journalists from California
Journalists from Pennsylvania
1951 births
60 Minutes correspondents
21st-century African-American people
20th-century African-American people
Jeopardy!